The Covered Wagon is a 1923 American silent Western film released by Paramount Pictures. The film was directed by James Cruze based on a 1922 novel of the same name by Emerson Hough about a group of pioneers traveling through the old West from Kansas to Oregon. J. Warren Kerrigan starred as Will Banion and Lois Wilson as Molly Wingate.  On their quest they experience desert heat, mountain snow, hunger, and Indian attack.

The Covered Wagon is one of many films from 1923 that entered the public domain in the United States on January 1, 2019.

Plot
The action is set in 1848. Two caravans of expatriates unite in Kansas and travel 2,000 miles west to start a new life in Oregon. The leader of the settlers is the elderly father and natural authority, Wingate. Scouts are the headstrong Sam Woodhull and the kind-hearted, talented Will Banion. Banion has a secret around a crime he is said to have committed in the army. 

Along the way, the pioneers suffer a number of hardships such as hunger and bad weather. In addition, Sam Woodhull embroil the settlers in clashes with Indians, and later aroused "gold fever" in some of the pilgrims when news of gold discoveries In California reach the settlers. A dispute ensues, and many families leave the caravan to go to California.

Time and again Sam Woodhull causes problems. He gets involved with Will Banion in a power struggle for the leadership of the wagon train, and also for the favors of the young Molly Wingate. Fortunately, Banion is succored by his old friend William Jackson, but in the end he also leaves the train shortly before reaching Oregon to seek his fortune in California, as Molly's father forbids a connection with his daughter. Unlike many of the Forty-Niners who sought riches in the Golden State, Banion is successful and strikes it rich.

Woodhull, spurned by Molly because she loves Banion, wants to get rid of him in California. He plans to shoot Banion from ambush. Fortunately, Jackson watches the scene and in turn shoots Woodhull dead. With Jackson's news that Molly is expecting him in Oregon, Will Banion and his wealth head for Oregon, where can finally take Molly into his arms.

Cast

Cast notes
 Tim McCoy, as Technical Advisor, recruited the Native Americans who appeared in this movie which included Northern Arapaho Nation from the Wind River Reservation in Wyoming. As he was the only person in the production team who could talk to the Arapahoes, he unwittingly became the technical advisor for the film.

Production
The film was a major production for its time, with an estimate budget of $782,000.

In his 1983 book Classics of the Silent Cinema, radio and TV host Joe Franklin claimed this film was "the first American epic not directed by Griffith".

In the 1980 documentary Hollywood: A Celebration of American Silent Cinema, Jesse L. Lasky Jr. maintained that the goal of director James Cruze was " ... to elevate the Western, which had always been sort of a potboiler kind of film, to the status of an epic".
  
The film required a large cast and film crew and many extras, and was filmed in various locations, including Palm Springs, California and several places in Nevada and Utah. The dramatic buffalo hunt and buffalo stampede scenes were filmed on Antelope Island, Great Salt Lake, Utah. During filming for the movie, seven bison from the Antelope Island Bison Herd were shot and killed [citation?]. 

The covered wagons gathered by Paramount from all over the Southwest were not replicas, but the real wagons that had brought the pioneers west. They were cherished heirlooms of the families who owned them. The producers offered the owners $2 a day and feed for their stock if they would bring the wagons for the movie. Most of the extras seen on film are the families who owned the covered wagons and were perfectly at home driving them and living out of them during the production.

Reception
The film premiered in New York City on March 16, 1923, and ran 98 minutes. A musical soundtrack was recorded in the short-lived DeForest Phonofilm sound-on-film process, but sources vary on whether this record soundtrack was of the entire score or about two reels worth of the film. The Phonofilm version of the film was only shown this way at the premiere at the Rivoli Theater in New York City. Paramount reportedly also released Bella Donna on April 1, 1923, with a Phonofilm soundtrack, also only at the premiere at the Rivoli.

The film was the second highest-grossing film of 1923. This was also President Warren G. Harding's favorite film as he showed it at a special screening at the White House during the summer of 1923.

The film is recognized by American Film Institute in these lists:
 2001: AFI's 100 Years...100 Thrills – Nominated

See also
 The House That Shadows Built (1931) promotional film released by Paramount with excerpt of The Covered Wagon

References

External links

 
 
 

1923 films
1920s romance films
1923 Western (genre) films
American adventure drama films
American black-and-white films
American Western (genre) epic films
American romance films
Famous Players-Lasky films
Films based on American novels
Films directed by James Cruze
Films shot in California
Films shot in Nevada
Films shot in Oregon
Films shot in Utah
Paramount Pictures films
Photoplay Awards film of the year winners
Surviving American silent films
Silent American Western (genre) films
1920s adventure drama films
1920s American films
Silent adventure drama films
Silent American drama films